Mitromorpha cubana is a species of sea snail, a marine gastropod mollusk in the family Mitromorphidae.

Description

Distribution
This species occurs in the Caribbean Sea.

References

 Espinosa J. & Ortea J. (2013) Nuevas especies de moluscos prosobranquios marinos de áreas caribeñas protegidas. Revista de la Academia Canaria de Ciencias, 25: 105-110

cubana
Gastropods described in 2013